Elands is a village on the Mid North Coast region of New South Wales. At the 2016 census, the population was 206. Ellenborough Falls is accessed via Elands.

References 

Towns in New South Wales
Mid North Coast